Arenc Dibra (born 11 May 1990) is an Albanian football player who plays for Vllaznia Shkodër in the Albanian First Division.

References

1990 births
Living people
Footballers from Shkodër
Albanian footballers
Association football midfielders
KF Vllaznia Shkodër players
KF Tërbuni Pukë players
KS Ada Velipojë players
Besëlidhja Lezhë players